Mistress Forrest (Margaret Foxe) and her maid servant Anne Burras, were the first two European women to come to the Virginia Colony. 
Arriving on October 1, 1608, in what is known as the Second Supply aboard the English ship the Mary and Margaret (or Mary-Margaret, both names appear in the records) under Captain Christopher Newport to resupply the colony at Jamestown, Virginia. Her husband Thomas Forrest (colonist) Esq. was listed as a gentleman on that ship as shown on its manifest, whereas she was listed only as Mistress Forrest. Thomas and Margaret had married on August 16, 1605, in St. Giles in the Fields, London, England.

Documents indicate that the first women at Jamestown were Mistress Forest and her maid Anne Burras, who landed with the Second Supply in 1608. Anne Burras is known to have married John Laydon, and both were listed in the 1625 muster. Mistress Forrest, probably the wife of gentleman Thomas Forrest, is not mentioned again in the historical record, and may have died soon after her arrival at Jamestown.

References

History of Virginia